Woman Series may refer to:

 Woman's film
 Women's tennis competitions
 The Woman series of paintings by Willem de Kooning